108 Shop is a Thai chain of franchise convenience stores, with locations nationwide. Sun 108 is the operator of 108 Shop convenience stores and is a subsidiary of Saha Pathanapibul Co.,Ltd (Saha Group)

In March 2013, Saha Group and Lawson, Inc. has launched in Thailand and it has created “LAWSON 108” as a special store brand for Thailand. 108 Shop is undergoing changed its name to LAWSON 108.

References 

Retail companies of Thailand
Convenience stores